A speedrun is a play-through of a video game (or a selected part of it) performed with the intent of completing it as fast as possible.

Speedrun or Speed Run or Speedrunner may also refer to:

 Tool-assisted speedrun, a speedrun performed using special tools
 Speed Run (video game), a video game played on Atari 8-bit computers
 Mos Speedrun, an 8-bit video game played on mobile devices
 SpeedRunners, a video game
 MDV 1200-class fast ferry vessels (includes a list of HSC Speedrunner vessels)